Beirut Pride is the annual non-profit LGBTIQ+ pride event and militant march held in Beirut, the capital of the Lebanon and aiming to decriminalize homosexuality in Lebanon.

Since its inception in 2017, Beirut Pride has been the first and only LGBTIQ+ pride in the Arab world, and its largest LGBTIQ+ event. It has been the topic of two MA theses, one post-doctoral research and six documentaries, so far covered in 17 languages in 350 articles. Its first installment gathered 4,000 persons, and 2,700 people participated in the first three days of its 2018 edition, before the police cracked it down and arrested its founder Hadi Damien. The next day, the prosecutor of Beirut suspended the scheduled activities, and initiated criminal proceedings against Hadi for organizing events “that incite to debauchery”. Its third edition took place in September/October 2019, and its fourth edition happened online in 2020, in the context the online Global Pride celebration, because of restrictions based on COVID-19, and because of the economic collapse of Beirut.

History
The global advances on the LGBT file and the momentum they created were the incentive for then 28-year old Hadi Damien to start planning Beirut Pride in August 2016. Acknowledging the need for a communications platform that stretches on several consecutive days, that speaks several languages, that taps into the universality of the creative sector, and that is structured, visible, loud and collaborative, Hadi approached friends and LGBT NGOs, gathering a group of dedicated people to reflect and to communicate on the LGBTIQ+ file in Lebanon.

Beirut Pride 2017 
The first edition of Beirut Pride took place on May 14–21, 2017 to coincide with the International Day Against Homophobia. It drew four thousand people who participated in an exhibition of gender-fluid garments and its roundtable, a 101 drag workshop, a lip-synching performance, an LGBT storytelling night, NGO open doors, film screenings, a roundtable about LGBT persons in Lebanese movies and TV series, several parties, a legal talk, the launching of 3 t-shirts designed by Bashar Assaf x Marwan Kaabour, a drag show, and a party in Mar Mkhayel, the trendiest nightlife street in Beirut, where 18 bars flew the rainbow flag. A march was scheduled for May 21, 2017, but in the days building to it, the intents for participation exceeded all expectations, and therefore, the planned logistics were insufficient to properly accompany the march. Therefore, organizers booked a large mountain land overlooking the Mediterranean, where participants indulged in barbecue, beer, live music, organic food, games, tanning and dancing. In support of Beirut Pride, several embassies flew the rainbow flag.

This edition was troubled when NGOs Proud Lebanon and Helem suffered from a call for boycott from organisations who called on to the authorities to stop both events. Each organization had planned a full conference day with performances, talks and screenings. The hotel that Proud Lebanon had booked cancelled the reservation, and Helem turned its event into a closed conference, broadcast on social media in an attempt to avoid violent escalation that would endanger the safety of the public and Lebanese society .

Beirut Pride 2018 
The second edition of Beirut Pride was scheduled for May 12–20, 2018. It started with a brunch in honor of the parents who did not kick their LGBT children from the family house because of their sexual orientation or gender identity. The opening party brought 800 persons who sang and cheered to the performance of Lebanese singer and dancer Khansa, acclaimed Sudanese Brooklyn-based music band “Alsarah and the Nubatones”, and danced to the disco music until the early morning hours. A Sunday brunch at the independent art incubator “Haven for Artists” featured a talk about trans-identity, followed by a talk with migrant workers about masculinity and femininity, before the massive Beirut Grand Ball. Additionally, Beirut Pride announced the Corporate Pledge project it was developing: a policy for corporations not to discriminate against staff and clients based on their sexuality and identity. Moreover, performances, talks, a gender-fluid fashion show and parties were programmed, a podcast and a magazine were ready to be launched. However, on the third night, Monday, May 14, 2018, Beirut Pride was raided following the dissemination of a homophobic, sensational, fabricated programme that was attributed to Beirut Pride. The police arrested the organiser of Beirut Pride, and despite the interrogation proving the falsity of the accusations, the general prosecutor of Beirut ordered the suspension of the scheduled activities before initiating criminal proceedings against Hadi Damien for organizing events “that incite to debauchery”.

Following the crackdown, Beirut Pride witnessed a surge in support with hundreds of people calling, sending messages and offering assistance. A media frenzy surrounded the event, and condemnations poured from international organisations, foreign governments, Lebanese parliamentarians, InterPride, and other prides such as Marseille Pride and Copenhagen Pride.

Beirut Pride 2019 
The third edition was announced for September 28 - October 6, 2019. The year 2019 also marks the 50th commemoration of the Stonewall riots. The opening ceremony that was supposed to be held in Aresco center 3 "The Palace" in Al Hamra, got postponed after the member of the republic asked to stop the festival's activities accusing them of "violating moralities". It had already lost the support of the community after a trans woman came out about her negative experience with the founder and people questioned how the event was managed.

Beirut Pride 2020 
The 2020 Beirut Pride event was held against the context of both the global COVID-19 pandemic and the devastation of much of Beirut by an explosion on 4 August. Beirut Pride offered a package of material related to arts, education, and mental support.

As most Pride events in the world were suspended due to COVID-19 restrictions, EPOA and InterPride organized Global Pride on June 27, a digital 27-consecutive-hour event streamed on YouTube and on several online channels. Beirut Pride secured contributions from Afghanistan, Armenia, Azerbaijan, Iran, Iraq, and Syria, in addition to the participation of other countries from the Middle East and the Arab World such as Egypt, Libya, Morocco, Palestine, Sudan, Tunisia, and groups from the Arab diaspora. Arabic-speaking participants also suggested Arabic terms that are equivalent to “Pride”, and voted on them, eventually choosing .

Beirut Pride contributed two videos to the Global Pride event. One produced by media platform Megaphone, released on the International Day Against Homophobia, Transphobia and Biphobia 2020, and offering an expansive overview on LGBTIQ+ realities in Lebanon; and a second, soothing, video "We Learn from Lebanon" depicting the movement of Mediterranean sea waves with a message of stability and steadfastness, produced by Beirut Pride just a few weeks before the Beirut explosion.

Beirut Pride Initiatives 
For Beirut Pride to sustainably grow, organizers went beyond Pride Days and started working on some LGBTIQ+ files. Beirut Pride opened channels of communication with all religious authorities and political parties. It lobbied during the Parliamentary elections of May 2018 for the decriminalization of homosexuality, which the Christian democratic Kataeb Party and some independent candidates endorsed from the civil society and from the traditional parties. Contributing to the fight against homophobia, Beirut Pride collaborated with the American University of Beirut and with the Lebanese American University. It maintained its media presence, and worked with journalists and reporters on several LGBTIQ+ coverage. Beirut Pride facilitated several photoshoots in Lebanon on LGBTIQ+ themes, and initiated the Arabic script #TypeWithPride based on the Gilbert Color Bold typeface, currently in development with designer Ghiya Haidar and Fontself. Through a regular presence on the international scene, participating to local and global talks, conferences and panels, expanding philanthropy and assistance, Beirut Pride constantly builds its reputation which positions it in the LGBTIQ+ global narrative.

HIV/AIDS 
For World AIDS Day, Beirut Pride launched a three-day event focusing on HIV and sexually transmitted infections. Organizers got the rights to adapt the UNAIDS World AIDS Day campaign of 2017, and renewed this collaboration in 2018. Beirut Pride also issued the trilingual HIV Multi-Sectorial Framework in Lebanon, before revisiting and augmenting a parliament bill that frames the rights of people living with HIV, emphasizes on national prevention outreach and criminalises discrimination against people with HIV.

See also

 Pride parade
 LGBT rights in Lebanon
 Human rights in Lebanon
 LGBT in the Middle East
 List of LGBT events
 List of LGBT awareness days

References

External links
Beirut Pride website

Festivals in Lebanon
Pride parades
LGBT in Lebanon
Culture in Beirut
Annual events in Lebanon
2017 in Lebanon
2018 in Lebanon
2010s in Beirut
Events in Beirut
Recurring events established in 2017
2017 establishments in Lebanon
LGBT culture in the Middle East
LGBT culture in the Arab world